Yaël Hassan is a French-Israeli writer born in Paris in 1952.
She spent her childhood in Belgium, her adolescence in France, and her youth in Israel. She returned to France in 1984 with her family.
Making the most of the time of a very long immobilization, she writes her first novel, A Grandfather Fallen from the Sky (in French Un grand-père tombé du ciel), which won the Youth Novel Prize (Prix du Roman Jeunesse) in 1996 from the Ministry of Youth and Sports, the Young Readers Grand Prize from PEEP in 1998 and the Sorceress Prize in 1998.

Works
The works of Yaël Hassan, the most part edited by Casterman, deal in general with simplicity of the subjects of actuality (the list below is not exhaustive).

 La chataîgneraie
 Petit Roman Portable
 Etre Juif aujourd'hui (illustré par Olivier Ranson)
 Ni D'Eve ni d'avant
 Quand Anne riait
 Le Professeur de musique
 Alex
 De Sacha @ Macha (aussi écrit par Rachel Hausfater)

References

External links

20th-century French Jews
Living people
1952 births
Writers from Paris